Michel Côté (born 12 August 1937) was a member of the National Assembly of Quebec for the Parti Québécois in La Peltrie from 1994 to 2003.

First elected in the 1994 election, he was re-elected in 1998.  He did not run for re-election in 2003.

External links
 

1937 births
Parti Québécois MNAs
French Quebecers
Living people
21st-century Canadian politicians